In mathematics, if  is a field extension of , then an element  of  is called an algebraic element over , or just algebraic over , if there exists some non-zero polynomial  with coefficients in  such that .

Examples 
(The definition of the term transcendental number uses , not .)

Properties 

The following conditions are equivalent for an element  of :

To make this more explicit, consider the polynomial evaluation . Hence the ring isomorphism  obtained by the homomorphism theorem is an isomorphism of fields, where we can then observe that . Investigating this construction yields the desired results.

Fields that do not allow any algebraic elements over them (except their own elements) are called algebraically closed. The field of complex numbers is an example. An example for this is the field of algebraic numbers.

See also
Algebraic independence

References

Abstract algebra